Yakymivka is an urban-type settlement in Melitopol Raion of Zaporizhzhia Oblast (province) in east-central Ukraine, but was formerly the administrative center of Yakymivka Raion. Population: .

Yakymivka was first mentioned in historical documents in 1833 and named in honor of Yakym Kolosov, regional police ispravnic.

See also

 Administrative divisions of Zaporizhzhia Oblast
 List of places named after people
 List of railway stations in Ukraine
 List of urban-type settlements in Ukraine by subdivision

References

Urban-type settlements in Melitopol Raion
Populated places established in the Russian Empire
Populated places established in 1833
1833 establishments in the Russian Empire